Robert "Bobby" Ronald Almond (born 16 April 1951 in England) was a footballer who represented New Zealand and was part of the first New Zealand side to contest a FIFA World Cup in 1982.

Career
Almond was a part of the Leyton Orient and Tottenham Hotspur youth set-ups and a first team player for Walthamstow Avenue in the Isthmian League before he emigrated to New Zealand in 1973.

Almond made his New Zealand debut in a 1–0 win over Australia on 13 June 1979. He pulled on the All White strip a total of 49 times between 1978 and 1982, although only 28 were full A-internationals.

He was a member the All Whites squad at the 1982 FIFA World Cup in Spain, playing in all 15 qualifiers, and started two games at the finals, the 5–2 loss to Scotland and 4–0 loss to Brazil, having to sit out the game against USSR with an Achilles tendon injury. Almond retired from international football following their elimination.

Almond co-authored a book, To Spain the Hard Way, with Steve Sumner and Derrick Mansbridge, chronicling the experience.

References

External links

1951 births
Living people
English footballers
New Zealand expatriate sportspeople in England
English emigrants to New Zealand
Association football central defenders
Naturalised citizens of New Zealand
New Zealand international footballers
New Zealand association footballers
1980 Oceania Cup players
1982 FIFA World Cup players